Trzciniec may refer to the following places:
Trzciniec, Gmina Białe Błota in Kuyavian-Pomeranian Voivodeship (north-central Poland)
Trzciniec, Gmina Sicienko in Kuyavian-Pomeranian Voivodeship (north-central Poland)
Trzciniec, Nakło County in Kuyavian-Pomeranian Voivodeship (north-central Poland)
Trzciniec, Gmina Lubartów in Lublin Voivodeship (east Poland)
Trzciniec, Gmina Michów in Lublin Voivodeship (east Poland)
Trzciniec, Łódź Voivodeship (central Poland)
Trzciniec, Gmina Chodel in Lublin Voivodeship (east Poland)
Trzciniec, Gmina Łaziska in Lublin Voivodeship (east Poland)
Trzciniec, Świętokrzyskie Voivodeship (south-central Poland)
Trzciniec, Mława County in Masovian Voivodeship (east-central Poland)
Trzciniec, Pułtusk County in Masovian Voivodeship (east-central Poland)
Trzciniec, Siedlce County in Masovian Voivodeship (east-central Poland)
Trzciniec, Warsaw West County in Masovian Voivodeship (east-central Poland)
Trzciniec, Silesian Voivodeship (south Poland)
Trzciniec, Drawsko County in West Pomeranian Voivodeship (north-west Poland)
Trzciniec, Myślibórz County in West Pomeranian Voivodeship (north-west Poland)

It may also refer to the Bronze Age Trzciniec culture